The Banavie Swing Bridge carries the A830 road across the Caledonian Canal at Banavie.

Design
The Banavie Swing Bridge crosses the canal at the bottom of Neptune's Staircase. It is adjacent to the Banavie Railway Swing Bridge which carries the West Highland Line.

See also
Banavie
Banavie railway station
Banavie Railway Swing Bridge

References

Swing bridges in Scotland
Bridges in Highland (council area)